The Executive Council is a formal body of advisers to the Chief Executive of Macau that serves as a core policy-making organ of the Government of Macau.

Composition
The members of Executive Council are appointed by the Chief Executive from among principal officials (heads of department, informally called "ministers"), members of Legislative Council, and public figures. Their appointment and removal is decided by the Chief Executive. There is no fixed term of office, but the term of office of members cannot extend beyond the expiry of that of the Chief Executive who appoints them.

The following list includes all members of the Executive Council in the order of precedence: 
Note: To avoid confusion, all the names on this list follow the Macau convention: Portuguese name <if available>, family name, (Chinese given name <if available>) for consistency.

List of the past Executive Councils

1st ExCo (1999–2004)

2nd ExCo (2004–2009)

3rd ExCo (2009–2014)

4th ExCo (2014–2019)

See also

 Politics of Macau
 Legislative Assembly of Macau

References

External links
Executive Council
 

Politics of Macau
Government of Macau
Macau Executive Council